Sheree-Lee Olson (born December 11, 1954) is a Canadian novelist, poet and journalist.

Biography
She was born in Picton, Ontario on the shores of Lake Ontario and grew up across Canada and in Europe, moving frequently with her family to her father's military postings. Eventually she earned degrees in visual art (York), philosophy (Leuven, in Belgium) and journalism (Ryerson). She was an editor at The Globe and Mail, Canada's leading national newspaper, from 1985 to 2013.

Olson's poetry and fiction can be found in Descant and The Antigonish Review. Her essays have appeared in The Globe and Mail and Between Interruptions: Thirty Women Tell The Truth About Motherhood (2007).

In 2007-08 she was the Webster/McConnell Fellow in the Canadian Journalism Fellowships Program at Massey College, University of Toronto.

Her first novel, Sailor Girl, was published in 2008 by Porcupine's Quill. It got attention across Canada and received several favourable reviews, including those on CBC Radio One Talking Books and in The Globe and Mail. A review in Canadian Literature journal concludes "Olson has announced herself as one of the new bright lights in Canadian literature."

In 2011, Olson received a "Bookmark" - a plaque bearing a selection from a notable Canadian literary work - in Port Colborne at Lock 8 on the Welland Canal, site of a key scene in Sailor Girl. Project Bookmark Canada celebrates locally inspired writing by installing Bookmarks in situ.

In 2013, producers Markham Street Films announced that Olson's Sailor Girl was under development as a feature film with director Anita Doron. The big screen adaption, with screenplay written by Johanna Schneller, begins filming in the summer of 2014.

References

External links
Official site
"Like Father, Like Daughter," essay in The Globe and Mail, August 14, 2007
Between Interruptions: Thirty Women Tell The Truth About Motherhood
Excerpt of Sailor Girl in The Globe and Mail, June 2, 2008 

1954 births
Living people
20th-century Canadian poets
21st-century Canadian novelists
21st-century Canadian poets
Canadian women novelists
Canadian women poets
Canadian people of Swedish descent
Writers from Toronto
People from Prince Edward County, Ontario
Canadian women short story writers
20th-century Canadian women writers
21st-century Canadian women writers
20th-century Canadian short story writers
21st-century Canadian short story writers